Katherine or Catherine Russell may refer to:
Katherine Russell (1909–1998), English social worker and university teacher
Katherine Russell Rich (1955–2012), American writer
Katheryn Russell-Brown (born 1961), American professor of law
Katharine Tait (Katharine Jane Russell), author and essayist, daughter of philosopher Bertrand Russell, granddaughter of Viscountess Amberley
Katharine Russell, Viscountess Amberley (Katharine Louisa Stanley, 1842–1874), British suffragette, grandmother of Katherine Tait
Katherine Russell, widow of Boston Marathon bomber Tamerlan Tsarnaev
Katherine Russell (1848–1915), Australian actress married to Alfred Dampier
Kate Russell (reporter) (Kathryn Jane Russell, born 1968), British reporter
Victoria Kate Russell, British portrait painter
Catherine Russell (American actress) (born 1956), American actress, known for her long-running appearance in the play Perfect Crime
Catherine Russell (British actress) (born 1965), British actress
Catherine Russell (singer) (born 1956), American jazz singer
Catherine M. Russell (born 1961), American federal government official

See also
Russell (surname)
Kate Russell (disambiguation)